British Transport Hotels (BTH) was the hotels and catering business of the nationalised railway system in Great Britain.

Origins of the company 
Britain's private railway companies pioneered the concept of the railway hotel, initially at locations such as London Euston and Birmingham Curzon Street where hotels were opened at the start of trunk railway operation in 1839.  Most of the railway companies followed suit, and by 1913 there were 93 railway owned hotels.  The policies of the 'big four' railway companies differed considerably, with the LMS and LNER railways being the most enthusiastic.

The Hotels Executive (1948–53) 

At the nationalisation of transport in Great Britain on 1 January 1948, and the establishment of the British Transport Commission, hotels and catering came under the control of BTC's Railway Executive. However, on 1 July 1948 they were separated from direct railway control and placed under British Transport Commission's Hotels Executive, chaired by Lord Inman, who was later succeeded by Sir Harry Methven. At this point the Hotels Executive acquired 55 hotels and 400 station refreshment rooms, along with various golf courses, tennis courts, laundries, wine cellars, bottling stores and even a farm (at St Ives in Cornwall).

British Transport Hotel and Catering Services (1953–63) 
The Conservative government elected in 1951 sought to alter the structure of the British Transport Commission and its subsidiaries.  One consequence was that the Hotels Executive was abolished on 19 August 1953, and the BTC took direct control, establishing a "Hotel and Catering Services Division" to run them.  Sir Harry Methven, the last Chairman of the Hotels Executive, became a member of the BTC.

British Transport Hotels Ltd (1963–83) 
Further change occurred in 1962 with the abolition of the BTC and the transfer of its rail businesses to the newly established British Railways Board.  The BRB Chairman, Richard Beeching, argued for the retention of the hotels within the BRB's rail portfolio, and BTH Ltd was established to manage them.  The intention was to give BTH a high degree of autonomy, including bringing in outside expertise in the hotel business to the BTH board.  The Railways Act 1968 empowered BTH to expand beyond the railway estate, and the company considered opening a number of new hotels.  In the event only one such hotel was opened – the Old Course at St Andrews – in 1968 before further expansion was stopped by the Conservative government elected in 1970.  The remainder of the hotel estate was rationalised – the 34 hotels inherited by BTH being reduced to 29 by 1979.

The end (1983–84) 
Following the victory of the Conservative Party at the 1979 general election, led by Prime Minister Margaret Thatcher, and the deteriorating economic situation, pressure was put on nationalised industries such as British Rail to consider asset disposal. It was not long before the BTH Hotels were under review. The management at the time, led by Peter Land, tried to establish a viable structure for a management buyout, which would have kept the group more or less intact and would have delivered a smooth transfer to the private sector. As Peter Land notes in his book Sauce Supreme, politics rendered this plan impossible and the hotels were sold by open tender, realising a much lower value for the UK taxpayer than the management buyout would have done. By 1984, the disposal was complete and the history of BTH was at an end.

Hotel portfolio 
The British Transport Commission took over the following hotels from the big four railway companies in 1948:

From the Great Western Railway

 Fishguard Bay Hotel, Fishguard (sold 1950, still operating)
 Grand Pump Room Hotel, Bath (sold 1956, now demolished)
 Great Western Royal Hotel, Paddington, London (sold 1983, still operating, now known as Hilton London Paddington)
 Manor House Hotel, Moretonhampstead, Devon (sold 1983, still operating, now known as Bovey Castle)
 Tregenna Castle Hotel, St. Ives, Cornwall (sold 1983, still operating)

From the London, Midland and Scottish Railway

 Adelphi Hotel, Liverpool (sold 1983, still operating)
 Caledonian Hotel, Edinburgh (sold 1981, still operating as Waldorf Astoria Edinburgh - The Caledonian), at the former Caledonian Railway's Princes Street station
 Central Hotel, Glasgow (sold 1983, still operating, now known as the Grand Central Hotel)
 Crewe Arms Hotel, Crewe (sold 1952, still operating)
 Dornoch Hotel, Dornoch (sold 1965, still operating)
 Euston Hotel, London (closed and demolished 1963)
 Exchange Hotel, Liverpool (closed 1971)
 Gleneagles Hotel, Auchterarder (sold 1981, still operating)
 Highland Hotel, Strathpeffer (sold 1958, still operating)
 Lochalsh Hotel, Kyle of Lochalsh (sold 1983, still operating)
 Midland Hotel, Bradford (closed 1975, reopened 1993)
 Midland Hotel, Derby (sold 1983, still operating)
 Midland Hotel, Manchester (sold 1983, still operating)
 Midland Hotel, Morecambe (sold 1952, subsequently closed.  Reopened in 2008)
 North Stafford Hotel, Stoke-on-Trent (sold 1953, still operating)
 Park Hotel, Preston (sold 1950, closed)
 Queen's Hotel, Birmingham (closed 1965)
 Queen's Hotel, Leeds (sold 1984, still operating)
 St Enoch Hotel, Glasgow (closed and demolished 1974)
 Station Hotel, Ayr (sold 1951, closed 2012)
 Station Hotel, Dumfries (sold 1972, still operating)
 Station Hotel, Holyhead (closed 1951, demolished late 1970's.)
 Station Hotel, Inverness (sold 1983, still operating - now named the Royal Highland Hotel)
 Station Hotel, Perth (sold 1983, still operating)
 Turnberry Hotel, Turnberry (sold 1983, still operating)
 Welcombe Hotel, Stratford-upon-Avon (sold 1983, still operating)

From the London and North Eastern Railway

 Cruden Bay Hotel, Port Erroll (sold 1951, closed)
 Felix Hotel, Felixstowe (sold 1952, closed)
 Grand Hotel, West Hartlepool (sold 1983, closed)
 Great Eastern Hotel, Liverpool Street, London (sold 1983, still operating, now known as Andaz Liverpool Street)
 Great Eastern Hotel, Parkeston Quay, Harwich (closed 1963)
 Great Northern Hotel, King's Cross, London (sold 1983, still operating)
 Great Northern Hotel, Peterborough (sold 1983, still operating)
 Great Northern Station Hotel, Leeds (sold 1952, closed)
 Great Northern Victoria Hotel, Bradford (sold 1952, still operating)
 North British Station Hotel, Glasgow (sold 1984, still operating, now known as the Millennium Hotel)
 North British Station Hotel, Edinburgh (sold 1981, still operating, now known as the Balmoral Hotel)
 Royal Hotel, Grimsby (sold 1949, closed and demolished late 1960's.)
 Royal Station Hotel, York (sold 1983, still operating, now known as The Principal York)
 Royal Station Hotel, Hull (sold 1983, still operating)
 Royal Station Hotel, Newcastle upon Tyne (sold 1983, still operating)
 Royal Victoria Station Hotel, Sheffield (sold 1982, still operating, now known as the Crowne Plaza Royal Victoria)
 Sandringham Hotel, Hunstanton (sold 1950, closed)
 Station Hotel, Aberdeen (sold 1983, still operating)
 Yarborough Hotel, Grimsby (sold 1952, still operating)
 Zetland Hotel, Saltburn-by-the-Sea (sold 1976, closed)

From the Southern Railway

 Charing Cross Hotel, Charing Cross, London (sold 1983, still operating)
 Craven Hotel, Charing Cross, London (sold 1963, closed)
 Grosvenor Hotel, Victoria, London (sold 1983, still operating)
 Knowle Hotel, Sidmouth (sold 1951, closed)

Gallery

References

 
 Whitaker's Almanack (various dates)
 P. A. Land (Managing Director, British Transport Hotels, 1978–1983) Sauce Supreme (2010) - The annihilation of British Transport Hotels Ltd. Peter A. Land's memoirs regarding the final days of British Transport Hotels Ltd. 
 Geoffrey Skelsey LVO, Famous Hotel Keepers for Over a Century: British Railway Hotels under State Ownership 1948-84 (in BackTrack vol 20, No 7, July 2006)

British Rail brands
Railway hotels in the United Kingdom
British Rail subsidiaries and divisions